The Hangzhou International Marathon (Chinese: 杭州国际马拉松赛) is an annual marathon race held in November in Hangzhou, China. It has been recognized by AIMS since 2007.

Event programme
Full marathon (42.195K)
Half marathon (21.0975K)
Short marathon (13.8K)
Mini marathon (6.8K)
Family run & couple run (1.2K)

Winners

Multiple wins

By country

References

External links 
 



Marathons in China
Sport in Hangzhou
Recurring sporting events established in 1987
Autumn events in China